Ridpath may refer to:

People
Bruce Ridpath (1884–1925), Canadian ice hockey player
George Ridpath (died 1726), Scottish journalist and author
Ian Ridpath (born 1947), English science writer, journalist, astronomer

John Ridpath (1936–2021), Canadian objectivist philosopher, lecturer, historian, author
John Clark Ridpath (1849–1900), American educator, historian, and editor
Michael Ridpath (born 1961), English author
Thomas Ridpath (1851–1900), English stamp dealer

Other
Ridpath Junior Public School, Lakefield, Ontario, Canada
Ridpath Hotel, Spokane, Washington, United States, an apartment complex